The Spain women's national under-20 football team represents Spain in international football in under-20 categories and is controlled by the Royal Spanish Football Federation.

Fixtures and results

Legend

2021

2022

 Fixtures and results (Spain Under 20) – Soccerway.com

Players

Current squad
The following players were called up to the squad for the Torneo Costa Daurada (Salou) from 26 to 30 November 2021.

Recent call-ups
The following players were named to a squad in the last calls.

Previous rosters
 2004 FIFA U-19 Women's World Championship squad
 2016 FIFA U-20 Women's World Championship squad
 2018 FIFA U-20 Women's World Championship squad

Statistics

Most appearances

Top goalscorers

Those marked in bold went on to earn full international caps

Hat-tricks

Competitive record

FIFA U-20 Women's World Cup record

See also
 Spain women's national football team
 Spain women's national under-19 football team
 Spain women's national under-17 football team

References

European women's national under-20 association football teams
Football